Marriage vows are promises each partner in a couple makes to the other during a wedding ceremony based upon Western Christian norms. They are not universal to marriage and not necessary in most legal jurisdictions. They are not even universal within Christian marriage, as Eastern Christians do not have marriage vows in their traditional wedding ceremonies.

Background

In the time of the Roman Empire (17 BC476 AD) the lower classes had "free" marriages. The bride's father would deliver her to the groom, and the two agreed that they were wed, and would keep the vow of marriage by mutual consent. Wealthy Romans, though, would sign documents listing property rights to publicly declare that their union was legalized and not a common law marriage. This was the beginning of the official recording of marriage.

The oldest traditional wedding vows can be traced back to the manuals of the medieval church. In England, there were manuals of the dioceses of Salisbury (Sarum) and York. The compilers of the first Book of Common Prayer, published in 1549, based its marriage service mainly on the Sarum manual. Upon agreement to marry, the Church of England usually offered couples a choice. The couple could promise each other to "love and cherish" or, alternatively, the groom promises to "love, cherish, and worship", and the bride to "love, cherish, and obey".

Christianity

Roman Catholic 

Couples wedding in the Latin Church of the Catholic Church essentially make the same pledge to one another. According to the Rite of Marriage (#25) the customary text in English is:

I, take you, to be my (husband/wife). I promise to be true to you in good times and in bad, in sickness and in health. I will love you and honour you all the days of my life.

In the United States, Catholic wedding vows may also take the following form:

I, take you, to be my  lawfully wedded (husband/wife), to have and to hold, from this day forward, for better, for worse, for richer, for poorer, in sickness and in health, until death do us part.

The priest will then say aloud "You have declared your consent before the Church. May the Lord in his goodness strengthen your consent and fill you both with his blessings. What God has joined, men must not divide. Amen."

Historically, in the Sarum Rite of the Catholic Church, vow of the wife reads as follows:

N. Vis habere hunc uirum in sponsum et illi obedire et servire et eum diligere et honorare ac custodire sanum et infirmum sicut sponsa debet sponsum, etc.

In English, the bride says:

Ich .N. take the .N. to my weddyd housbonde to hau and to holden fro this day forward, for bettere, for wers, for richere for porere, in seknesse and in helthe to be boneyre and buxsum in bedde and at borde, tyl deth us departe, zif holi cherche hit wyle ordeyne and there to y plight the my treuthe.

Lutheran
The  wedding vows used in the Lutheran Churches are as follows:

Anglican

The law in England authorizes marriages to be legal if properly carried out and registered in the Church of England and some other religious bodies (e.g. Jewish, Quakers): other men and women who wish to marry can be married by a local official authorized to do so (civil ceremony). Circumstances may result in the same partners having both ceremonies at different times, though this is rare. The vows, presence of witnesses, and civil registration are absolute requirements under the law.

Civil ceremonies often allow couples to choose their own marriage vows, although many civil marriage vows are adapted from the traditional vows, taken from the Book of Common Prayer, "To have and to hold from this day forward, for better for worse, for richer for poorer, in sickness and in health, to love and to cherish, till death us do part."

They were first published in English in the prayer book of 1549, based on earlier Latin texts (the Sarum and York Rituals of the medieval period). An older version of the final phrase is " until death us depart" where "depart" means "separate". "Until death us depart" had to be changed due to changes in the usage of "depart" in the Prayer Book of 1662. In the 1928 prayer book (not authorized) and in editions of the 1662 prayer book printed thereafter "obey" was retained (in the 1928 book an alternative version omitted this). The 1928 revised form of Matrimony was quite widely adopted, though the form of 1662 was also widely used, though less so after the introduction of the Alternative Service Book.

The original wedding vows, as printed in The Book of Common Prayer, are:

Groom: I,, take thee,_, to be my  wedded Wife, to have and to hold from this day forward, for better for worse, for richer for poorer, in sickness and in health, to love and to cherish, till death do us part, according to God's holy ordinance; and thereto I plight thee my troth.Bride: I,_, take thee,_, to be my  wedded Husband, to have and to hold from this day forward, for better for worse, for richer for poorer, in sickness and in health, to love, cherish, and to obey, till death us do part, according to God's holy ordinance; and thereto I give thee my troth.

Then, as the groom places the ring on the bride's finger, he says the following:

With this Ring I thee wed, with my body I thee worship, and with all my worldly goods I thee endow: In the name of the Father, and of the Son, and of the Holy Ghost. Amen.

In the Alternative Service Book (1980) two versions of the vows are included: the bride and groom must select one of the versions only. Version A:
I, take you, to be my wife (or husband), to have and to hold from this day forward, for better, for worse, for richer, for poorer, in sickness and in health, to love and to cherish, till death us do part, according to God's holy law, and this is my solemn vow.

Version B is identical except for the clause "to love and to cherish" where the groom says "to love, cherish, and worship" and the bride says "to love, cherish, and obey".

Since 2000 the service in Common Worship the normal vows are as follows:

I, N, take you, N, to be my wife (or husband), to have and to hold from this day forward, for better, for worse, for richer, for poorer, in sickness and in health, to love and to cherish, till death us do part, according to God's holy law, in the presence of God I make this vow.

However, the bride and groom may choose to replace the clause "to love and to cherish" with "to love, cherish, and obey" when the bride makes her vows.<ref>Common Worship Pastoral Services' Church House Publishing; P 108 & P 150</ref>

On September 12, 1922, the Episcopal Church voted to remove the word "obey" from the bride's section of wedding vows. Other churches of the Anglican Communion each have their own authorized prayer books which in general follow the vows described above though the details and languages used do vary.

Quaker

In the United Kingdom, since the first law regulating marriage (the Marriage Act 1753), the state recognises marriages conducted by the "Society of Friends" (Quakers), Jews, and the Church of England.

The declarations made in Quaker marriage were first set down in a London Yearly Meeting minute in 1675 as such:

Man: Friends, in the fear of the Lord, and before this assembly, I take my friend AB to be my wife, promising, through divine assistance, to be unto her a loving and faithful husband, until it shall please the Lord by death to separate us.

Woman: Friends, in the fear of the Lord, and before this assembly, I take my friend CD to be my husband, promising, through divine assistance, to be unto him a loving and faithful wife, until it shall please the Lord by death to separate us.

The procedure is restated in a minute of London Yearly Meeting of 1754, and the declarations remained the same until the twentieth century.  In July 1922, the Committee on the Marriage Declaration was set up, and this reported to London Yearly Meeting in 1923, and after reference to a further committee the final phrase was changed to as long as we both on earth shall live; although the option of until it shall please the Lord by death to separate us remained as an alternative.

The current declarations allowed in Britain Yearly Meeting is:

Friends, I take this my friend [name] to be my spouse, promising, through divine assistance, to be unto him/her a loving and faithful spouse, so long as we both on earth shall live.

The following alternatives are currently allowed:
 The declaration may be prefaced by In the presence of God The declaration may be prefaced by In the fear of the Lord and in the presence of this assembly The word spouse may be replaced by wife or husband as appropriate or by partner in marriage The phrase through divine assistance may be replaced by the words with God’s help The phrase so long as we both on earth shall live may be replaced by the words until it shall please the Lord by death to separate us The declaration may be made in Welsh in "places where the Welsh tongue is used"

 Civil marriage 

England and Wales

Whilst couples may add to these, under the Marriage Act 1949, all civil marriage in England and Wales, and marriage by an authorised person (this includes religious marriage not carried out by the Anglican church, Jewish or Society of Friends (Quakers)), must include the following declaration and contracting words:

I call upon these persons here present to witness that I  do take thee  to be my lawfully wedded wife/husband.

The Marriage Ceremony (Prescribed Words) Act 1996 allowed an alternative declaration of either:

Registrar/Minister: Are you  free lawfully to marry Man/Woman: I am. 

and an alternative of the contracting words of:
I  take you/thee  to be my wedded wife/husband.

History

The wedding vows as practised in most English-speaking countries derive ultimately from the Sarum rite of mediaeval England.  The first part of the vows of the Sarum rite is given in Latin, but is instructed to be said by the priest "in linguam materna", i.e. in the "mother tongue" of those present.  The vows of the first English prayer book of 1549 mostly correspond to those of the Sarum rite.

 See also 

 Bride price
 Dowry
 Promise
 Vow

References

Further reading

 Daniel, Evan (1948) The Prayer-Book; its history, language and contents''; 26th ed. Redhill: Wells Gardner; pp. 491–96: The form of solemnization of matrimony
 
 

Anglican liturgy
Marriage
Oaths
Wedding